Cappon is a rural locality in Alberta, Canada.

Cappon has the name of one Professor Cappon, a Queens University faculty member.

References 

Localities in Special Area No. 3